Gurmukh Kaur Khalsa (born in 1943 as Mary May Gibson in Downers Grove, Illinois) is a teacher of Kundalini Yoga as taught by Yogi Bhajan and a pioneer in the field of pre-natal yoga. She is the co-founder and director of the Golden Bridge Yoga Center in Los Angeles, the author of two books and three DVDs. She has become a yoga guru for Hollywood film stars.

Early years

Mary May Gibson was born in a small Illinois town, to middle-class, Methodist parents. At age nineteen, she left her home to attend college at San Francisco State University in California. There, she married a Ph.D. student and in 1964, gave birth to an infant boy with a congenital heart defect. The child, named "Shannon Danuele" died seven months later.
After grieving the loss of the child, the marriage ended in an amicable divorce. From living in Haight Ashbury, she travelled Big Sur, then to Mexico, where she lived among tribal peoples. After that, she lived in Maui. Gurmukh then moved to a Zen Buddhist zendo where she practiced silent meditation seven hours a day for a year.

Introduction to Kundalini Yoga

In 1970, she and a colleague went to the 3HO ashram in Tucson, Arizona. She stayed in Arizona for two years, where she worked at the ashram, and taught yoga at the University of Arizona, as well as at the Arizona State Correctional Facility. It was in 1970 at the ashram that she met Yogi Bhajan, master of Kundalini Yoga. On their first meeting, he gave Mary a new name, “Gurmukh,” meaning “the one whose face is towards the Guru (meaning they have dedicated their lives to their Guru).” He also told her she would help deliver babies. She then worked in the field of home births with a Santa Fe obstetrician/gynecologist, after which teaching yoga became her full-time occupation.

Yoga for pregnant mothers 

In 1977, Gurmukh went on a pilgrimage to India and on her return moved to Los Angeles, where she met Gurushabd Singh Khalsa, whom she married in 1982. In February 1982, Gurmukh at the age of forty-three, gave birth to their daughter, Wahe Guru Kaur, at home with the help of a midwife. Thereafter, Gurmukh used her knowledge of Kundalini Yoga as taught by Yogi Bhajan and her own pregnancy experiences to give classes for expectant mothers. This eventually led to a childbirth education program she was to call “The Khalsa Way”, and her own pre- and post- natal videos. She also began a sixty-hour Khalsa Way Teachers Training certification course for women from around the world to take to their communities. In 2003, Gurmukh published the book, Bountiful, Beautiful, Blissful: Exploring the Natural Power of Pregnancy and Birth with Kundalini Yoga and Meditation, with St. Martin's Press publishers.

Kundalini Yoga
In her life as a Kundalini Yoga teacher based in Los Angeles, Gurmukh developed a celebrity clientele. She gave private instructions to Madonna, Courtney Love, Gwyneth Paltrow, David Duchovny, Annette Bening and Rosanna Arquette. Eventually, with the guidance of her teacher, Gurmukh Kaur gave up the private classes with stars. In 2000, she published the popular guide Eight Human Talents: The Yoga Way to Restore the Balance and Serenity Within You with HarperCollins publishers in New York. In 2002, Gurmukh and Gurutej Kaur co-founded the Golden Bridge Yoga Center in Los Angeles. Gurmukh and her husband teach classes, and offer workshops and teacher trainings around the world. In 2007, Vanity Fair described her as the "glamour girl of Kundalini".

Publications
 Gurmukh Kaur Khalsa, Eight Human Talents: The Yoga Way to Restore the Balance and Serenity Within You, New York, Harper Collins, 2000.
 Gurmukh Kaur Khalsa, Bountiful, Beautiful, Blissful: Exploring the Natural Power of Pregnancy and Birth with Kundalini Yoga and Meditation, New York, St. Martins Griffin, 2003.

DVDs
 Prenatal Kundalini Yoga and meditation for mothers-to-be, Gaiam (2000)
 Postnatal Kundalini Yoga for new mothers, Gaiam (2000)
 Kundalini Yoga with Gurmukh, Living Arts (2004)

Articles
 Joanne Chen, "Spiritual Love," Vogue, April 1999.
 Anna Dubrovsky, "Kundalini's Queen: Gurmukh Kaur Khalsa", Yoga International
 Samantha Dunn, "L.A. (Yoga) Story", Yoga Journal, July–August 1999
 Julie Deife, "Sitting Down with Gurmukh", LA Yoga Magazine, January–February 2005

References

External links

 Golden Bridge Global Yoga
 Khalsa Way Prenatal Yoga Teacher Training

Living people
American yoga teachers
Converts to Sikhism
American Sikhs
1943 births
San Francisco State University alumni
American expatriates in Mexico